The De Francis Memorial Dash is a Listed American Thoroughbred horse race run annually at Laurel Park Racecourse in Laurel, Maryland. Open to horses aged three and older, it is competed on dirt over a distance of six furlongs. It is currently run in late November and offers a purse of $250,000.

Race history 

The Frank J. De Francis Memorial Dash is one of the elite sprints in the country. Until 2010, it was one of the only two six-furlong contests with Grade I status, and was second only to the Breeders' Cup Sprint in purse money and prestige.  After the race was not run in 2008 and 2010, the race was not eligible for grading in 2011. On December 3, 2015, the Maryland Jockey Club announced that the race has been upgraded to grade III for 2016 by the American Graded Stakes Committee.

The De Francis, first contested in 1990, has played host to champions Housebuster, Safely Kept, and Cherokee Run.

The inaugural De Francis Dash attracted the nation's finest sprinters to Pimlico Race Course in the summer of 1990. Included in the spectacular field were 1989 Sprint Champion Safely Kept and top sprinters Glitterman and Sewickley. But at the wire, in a fitting tribute to the late Mr. De Francis, it was Maryland-bred, Maryland-based Northern Wolf in a track record-setting time of 1:09.

The Dash moved to Laurel for its second running. The distinguished field included two champions; Safely Kept and Housebuster as well as leading sprinters Clever Trevor and Sunny Blossom. Housebuster captured the winner's share of the lucrative purse with a five length victory. He was named Eclipse Award Sprint Champion for the second year in a row.

During the next nine years while the Dash reigned as Laurel Park's signature summer event, it was captured by two additional Sprint Champions: Cherokee Run (1994) and Smoke Glacken (1997).

The race was moved to the fall by Maryland Jockey Club Chief Operating Officer Lou Raffetto in 2001 with instant success. Taking advantage of a deep sprinting field three weeks after the Breeders' Cup Sprint, the De Francis Dash attracted a strong field of seven, including four of the top Breeder's Cup finishers with visions of an Eclipse Award. 
 
The De Francis Dash was given Graded stakes status in 1992 and became a Grade I event in 1998.  On August 7, 2008 it was announced that the race would be on hiatus for 2008, the Maryland Jockey Club cited financial distress as the reason for the races' cancellation.

It became a grade I race in 1999, but was not run in 2008 and 2010. The race lost its graded status when restored in 2011, then became a Grade III event in 2016.

The De Francis Memorial Dash (G3)  is the final and championship leg of the Mid Atlantic Thoroughbred Championships Sprint Dirt Division or MATCh Races.  MATCh is a series of five races in five separate thoroughbred divisions run throughout four Mid-Atlantic States including; Pimlico Race Course and Laurel Park Racecourse in Maryland; Delaware Park Racetrack in Delaware; Parx, Philadelphia Park and Presque Isle Downs in Pennsylvania and Monmouth Park in New Jersey.

Records
Speed  record:
 1:07.80 – Richter Scale (2000)    {Stakes and track record}

Most wins:
 2 – Lite The Fuse (1995, 1996)

Most wins by a jockey:
 3 – Craig Perret (1991, 1994, 1997)
 3 – Jerry Bailey (1999, 2001, 2005)

Most wins by a trainer:
 2 – Richard Dutrow Sr. (1995, 1996)
 2 – Ben W. Perkins Jr. (2001, 2004)
 2 – D. Wayne Lukas (1999, 2014)

Most wins by an owner:
 2 – Richard Dutrow Sr. (1995, 1996)

Winners De Francis Memorial Dash Stakes since 1990

See also 
 Frank J. De Francis Memorial Dash Stakes "top three finishers" and starters
 Laurel Park Racecourse
 American Champion Sprint Horse   
 Breeders' Cup Sprint

References

 Frank J. DeFrancis Memorial Dash Stakes at Pedigree Query
 The Frank J. De Francis Memorial Dash at Laurel Park Racecourse
 Race Record of Northern Wolf
 Race Record of Housebuster
 Race Record of Vineyard Haven

Horse races in the United States
Open sprint category horse races
1990 establishments in Maryland
Laurel Park Racecourse
Horse races in Maryland
Recurring sporting events established in 1990